Álvaro López (born 6 August 1998) is an Argentine professional footballer who plays as a forward for Boston River.

Career
López came through the youth systems of ACDC Patagonia and Vélez Sarsfield. In June 2018, López joined Primera B Metropolitana's Almirante Brown on a season-long deal. He made his bow on 1 September versus All Boys, an opponent he later scored his first senior goal against in the succeeding February.

In January 2022, López joined Uruguayan club Boston River.

Career statistics
.

References

External links

1998 births
Living people
Argentine footballers
Argentine expatriate footballers
Place of birth missing (living people)
Association football forwards
Primera B Metropolitana players
Primera Nacional players
Uruguayan Primera División players
Club Atlético Vélez Sarsfield footballers
Club Almirante Brown footballers
Boston River players
Argentine expatriate sportspeople in Uruguay
Expatriate footballers in Uruguay